Abū Muḥammad al-Ḥasan b Mūsā an-Nawbakhtī (born late 9th century and died between 912 and 922) was a Persian and leading Shī'ī theologian and philosopher in the first half of the 10th century. The Nawbakhtī family boasted a number of scholars famous  at the Abbāsid court of Hārūn al-Rashīd.  Al-Ḥasan ibn Mūsa is best known for his book about the Shi'a sects titled Firaq al-Shi'a.

Life
Abū Muḥammad al-Ḥasan ibn Mūsa al-Nawbakhti was the nephew of the theologian philosopher Abū Sahl ibn Nawbakht. Among his fellow translators of books of philosophy were Abū 'Uthmān al-Dimashqi, Isḥāq ibn Ḥunayn, and Thābit ibn Qurra.  It was claimed al-Ḥasan ibn Mūsa was both Muʿtazila and Shī’a for the Nawbakht family were known followers of ‘Alī.
He transcribed a large number of books and wrote books on theology, philosophy and other topics.

Works

 ar-Radd 'alā' l-ġulāt '

Titles listed in al-FihristKitāb al-arā' wa-'d-diyānāt; Doctrines and Religions (unfinished)Kitāb ar-radd alā' aṣḥāb at-tanāsukh; Refutation of Upholders of Transmigration (At-tanāsukh)Kitāb at-tawḥīd wa ḥadīth al-Ilal; Oneness and the Principal CauseKitāb naqḍ Refutation BookKitāb Abū ‘Īsā fī ‘l-gharīb al-mashraqī; Refutation of the Book of Abū ‘Īsā about the Unusual Eastern Kitāb Ikhtiṣārī Ikhtiṣār al-kūn wa’l-fasād li-Arisṭālīs; Abridgement of Aristotle’s “De Generatione et Corruptione”Kitāb al-Ihtijāj li ‘Umar ibn ‘Abbād wa nuṣrat madhabuhu ; Proof by Umar ibn ‘Abbād and a Defense of his DoctrinesKitāb al-Āmāmat; ‘The Imamate’ (unfinished)

Notes

References

Bibliography
 Abbas Kadhim (transl.):  Shī'a Sects (Kitāb Firaq Al-Shī'a) ''. London: ICAS Press 2007
 Norman Calder and Jawid Ahmad Mojaddedi: "Classical Islam: A Sourcebook of Religious Literature." Routledge Chapman & Hall. 2003 (Online Excerpt)

External links
 
 al-Nawbakhti, al-Hasan b. Musa. The Shi'ite Sects.. Annotated translation from Arabic, Study and Notes by S.M. Prozorov. Moscow, 1973.

9th-century births
9th-century Muslim scholars of Islam
10th-century deaths
Scholars from the Abbasid Caliphate
History of Islam
Shia Muslims
9th-century Iranian philosophers
10th-century Iranian philosophers